Peristeri ("pigeon") is an islet close to the northern coast of Crete, in the Perama district of the Geropotamos municipality, in Rethymno regional unit.

See also
List of islands of Greece

References 

Landforms of Rethymno (regional unit)
Uninhabited islands of Crete
Islands of Greece